Anemopaegma is a genus of flowering plants in the family Bignoniaceae. Species of Anemopaegma along with many other unrelated plants go by the name of catuaba.

Species
Species include:
Anemopaegma acutifolium DC.
Anemopaegma alatum A.H.Gentry
Anemopaegma album Mart. ex DC.
Anemopaegma arvense (Vell.) Stellfeld ex De Souza
Anemopaegma brevipes S.Moore
Anemopaegma chamberlaynii (Sims) Bureau & K.Schum.
Anemopaegma chrysanthum Dugand
Anemopaegma chrysoleucum (Kunth) Sandwith
Anemopaegma citrinum Mart. ex DC.
Anemopaegma colombianum (Sandwith) A.H.Gentry
Anemopaegma flavum Morong
Anemopaegma floridum Mart. ex DC.
Anemopaegma foetidum Bureau & K.Schum.
Anemopaegma glaucum Mart. ex DC.
Anemopaegma goyazense K.Schum.
Anemopaegma gracile Bureau & K.Schum.
Anemopaegma grandifolium (Jacq.) Merr. & Sandwith
Anemopaegma granvillei A.H.Gentry
Anemopaegma heringeri J.C.Gomes
Anemopaegma hilarianum Bureau & K.Schum.
Anemopaegma insculptum (Sandwith) A.H.Gentry
Anemopaegma ionanthum A.H.Gentry
Anemopaegma jucundum Bureau & K.Schum.
Anemopaegma karstenii Bureau & K.Schum.
Anemopaegma laeve DC.
Anemopaegma longidens Mart. ex DC.
Anemopaegma longipetiolatum Sprague
Anemopaegma mirabile (Sandwith) A.H.Gentry
Anemopaegma oligoneuron (Sprague & Sandwith) A.H.Gentry
Anemopaegma orbiculatum (Jacq.) DC.
Anemopaegma pabstii A.H.Gentry
Anemopaegma pachyphyllum Bureau & K.Schum.
Anemopaegma paraense Bureau & K.Schum.
Anemopaegma parkeri Sprague
Anemopaegma patelliforme A.H.Gentry
Anemopaegma prostratum DC.
Anemopaegma puberulum (Seibert) Miranda
Anemopaegma robustum Bureau & K.Schum.
Anemopaegma rugosum (Schltdl.) Sprague
Anemopaegma salicifolium (Kunth) Sandwith
Anemopaegma santaritense A.H.Gentry
Anemopaegma scabriusculum Mart. ex DC.
Anemopaegma setilobum A.H.Gentry
Anemopaegma velutinum Mart. ex DC.
Anemopaegma villosum A.H.Gentry

References

Ellison, D. (1999). Cultivated Plants of the World. London: New Holland (1st ed.: Brisbane: Flora Publications International, 1995) 
Graf, A. B. (1986). Tropica: Color Cyclopedia of Exotic Plants and Trees. 3rd ed. East Rutherford, N.J.: Roehrs Co
Botanica Sistematica

 
Bignoniaceae genera